James Edwin Tracy (born December 31, 1955) is a former Major League Baseball (MLB) manager and player. He played for the Chicago Cubs in 1980 and 1981, and has managed the Los Angeles Dodgers, Pittsburgh Pirates, and Colorado Rockies. Tracy was named Manager of the Year in 2009, only the second manager to win the award after being hired mid-season, joining Jack McKeon for the Florida Marlins.

Playing career
Tracy was an All-America baseball player at Marietta College, an NCAA Division III institution in Ohio. In 1976, he played collegiate summer baseball with the Chatham A's of the Cape Cod Baseball League and was named a league all-star.

He played as an outfielder for parts of two seasons with the Chicago Cubs in 1980–81. He also played two seasons in Japan with the Yokohama Taiyo Whales in 1983–84.

Managing career
Tracy worked as a minor league manager for several organizations including the Ottawa Lynx in 1994. He is featured as the manager of the 1988 Peoria Chiefs in the book "The Boys Who Would Be Cubs", by Joseph Bosco . Tracy later served as the bench coach of the Montreal Expos (under manager Felipe Alou), and the Dodgers (under manager Davey Johnson) in 1999 and 2000.

Los Angeles Dodgers
Tracy was manager of the Los Angeles Dodgers from 2001 to 2005, compiling four winning seasons and a 427–383 record. With Tracy as manager, the Dodgers won the National League West division in 2004 but lost 3-1 to the St. Louis Cardinals in the National League Division Series. On October 3, 2005, after finishing the season at 71-91, Tracy and the Dodgers agreed to part ways citing "philosophical differences."

Pittsburgh Pirates
Tracy was hired by the Pittsburgh Pirates on October 11, 2005. In two disappointing seasons in Pittsburgh, he compiled a 135–189 record. Tracy was fired by the Pirates on October 5, 2007.

Colorado Rockies
Tracy was hired as bench coach for the Colorado Rockies in November 2008. On May 29, 2009, Clint Hurdle was fired with an 18–28 record, and Tracy was named to replace him. Tracy led the Rockies to the postseason, with a 74–42 (.638) record after taking over as manager, but lost the NLDS to the Philadelphia Phillies by a score of 3 games to 1. For his efforts in the 2009 season, Tracy won the National League Manager of the Year Award as voted on by the Baseball Writers' Association of America. He was also named the NL Manager of the Year by The Sporting News. On November 19, 2009, Tracy was rewarded with a three-year contract extension.

In 2010, the Rockies lost 13 of their last 14 games, collapsing from a  game deficit in the wild card race to finish 7 games behind an Atlanta Braves team that went 6-8 in the same span. In 2011, the Rockies began the season with an 11-2 record before finishing the season with a 62-87 (.416) run that landed them in 4th place.

After the 2011 season, the Rockies rewarded Tracy with an "indefinite" contract extension. The Rockies went on to accumulate a 37-65 record (.363) through August 1, leading to a front office reshuffle that left Jim Tracy and his staff intact. Tracy resigned as manager of the Rockies on October 7, 2012, following a disappointing and injury plagued 2012 season that saw the Rockies finish 64-98, the worst record in franchise history.

Managerial record

Personal life
Tracy's oldest son, Brian, played baseball at UC Santa Barbara, and was drafted in 2007 by the Pirates. Brian later became a scout for the Pirates. Son Chad played in the minor leagues for eight seasons, including four seasons in Triple-A for three different franchises. Chad, along with Bryan LaHair and Nick Stavinoha, led Triple-A in RBIs in 2011, with 109. Chad later became a minor-league manager. Youngest son Mark also played minor league baseball from 2010 to 2013.

See also

References

External links

BucsDugout.com – article about Tracy's tendencies as manager of the Dodgers

1955 births
Living people
Colorado Rockies (baseball) coaches
Colorado Rockies managers
Chicago Cubs players
Los Angeles Dodgers coaches
Los Angeles Dodgers managers
Major League Baseball bench coaches
Major League Baseball outfielders
Manager of the Year Award winners
Marietta Pioneers baseball players
Montreal Expos coaches
Baseball players from Ohio
Sportspeople from Hamilton, Ohio
Pittsburgh Pirates managers
Pompano Beach Cubs players
Midland Cubs players
Wichita Aeros players
Tucson Toros players
Iowa Cubs players
Chatham Anglers players
Chattanooga Lookouts managers
American expatriate baseball players in Japan
Yokohama Taiyō Whales players